Troyville Earthworks (16 CT 7) is a Woodland period Native American archaeological site with components dating from 100 BCE to 700 CE during the Baytown to the Troyville-Coles Creek periods. It is located in Catahoula Parish, Louisiana in the town of Jonesville. The site is the type site for the Troyville culture of the lower Ouachita and Tensas River valleys. Before it was destroyed for bridge approach fill in 1931, the main mound at Troyville was one of the tallest in North America.

Site description

The site is at the confluence of the Tensas, Ouachita, and Little Rivers. It had nine platform mounds and a perimeter embankment that were built before 700 CE. A historian, John W. Monette, in 1844 described the complex as occupying close to 400 acres and noted the existence of twelve small mounds and one large one. The embankment was started during the Middle Baytown period, with periodic repair work taking place during the Late Baytown period. It was the tallest precolumbian mound in Louisiana and the second tallest in North America. Its base covered an acre of ground and had three levels, the bottom two rectangular and the third on the top a truncated conical mound.

During the Civil War, the mound was reduced even further when some of its fill was removed to construct Confederate rifle pits. In 1871 the town of Jonesville was founded on the site and more of Mound A's fill was used to fill ditches (borrow pits created by the removal of earth to construct the mounds themselves) and level the land as the town grew. The townspeople frequently camped out on the mounds during flooding.

In 1883 the site was visited by the prominent ethnologist Cyrus Thomas, who described the group as then consisting of six mounds within an embankment, with some of the smaller mounds having been largely destroyed. One had been turned into a modern cemetery, which can still be seen today on the grounds of the local Methodist Church. In 1931 the mound was drastically reduced in size, the majority of its remaining mass being used as fill for a nearby bridge approach. Today the mound is only  in height.

Excavations

The site takes its name from the Troy Plantation, which was part of a Spanish land grant of 1,000 acres made to John Hebrard in 1786. William Dunbar was the first European to make note of the mound site in his report to Thomas Jefferson for the Red River expedition of 1804. It is the first written description of an archaeological site in Louisiana.

In 1931 and 1932 the Smithsonian archaeologist Winslow Walker excavated parts of the site. He found woven cane matting, palmetto fronds, and wooden planks within the mound, materials used by the Native Americans as part of the complex engineering to build the large structure. These materials had been used to construct a "cane dome", which had been layered like an onion by alternating layers of split cane and mound fill to strengthen the structure. The builders also used different colors of dirt, including blue clays and red clays. Walker also discovered a log palisade and steps made of tree trunks up one corner of the mound. He published a 103-page booklet on his work.

In the late 2000s parts of the site were being investigated for purchase by The Archaeological Conservancy, a nonprofit organization that plans to protect the site from future degradation. The Conservancy purchased the site of Mound 4 and the old house located on the property was demolished. The Conservancy plans to landscape and fence the site and use it as a research preserve.

See also
 Monks Mound
 Culture, phase, and chronological table for the Mississippi Valley

References

External links

Troyville Earthworks I: Ancient Mounds Trail - Louisiana Historical Markers on Waymarking.com
 Troyville Earthworks II: Ancient Mounds Trail - Louisiana Historical Markers on Waymarking.com
 Jonesville site (Troyville Great Mound)
 The builders of the Great Mound at Jonesville
 Great Mound was once the tallest in North America

Troyville culture
Archaeological sites of the Coles Creek culture
Mounds in Louisiana
Geography of Catahoula Parish, Louisiana